The Okayama Yunogo Belle is a Japanese women's football club based in Mimasaka, Okayama, Japan.

Founded in 2001, in 2003 it made its debut in the Nadeshiko League, where it has played since except for the 2004 season. Its best results to date are 3rd spot in 2012. In 2006 it also reached the national cup's final.

Squad

Current squad

Honours

Domestic Competitions
Empress's Cup All-Japan Women's Football Tournament
Runners-up (1) : 2006
Nadeshiko League Cup
Runners-up (1) : 2013

Results

References

External links
 Okayama Yunogo Belle official site
 Japanese Club Teams

Women's football clubs in Japan
Association football clubs established in 2001
2001 establishments in Japan
Sports teams in Okayama Prefecture
Japan Women's Football League teams